Paraetisus globulus is a species of crab in the family Xanthidae, the only species in the genus Paraetisus. It was described in 1933 by Charles Melbourne Ward.

References

Xanthoidea
Monotypic arthropod genera